The yips can refer to:

Yips, an apparently baseless loss of ability to perform in various sports
"The Yips" (How I Met Your Mother), a 2007 episode of the situation comedy How I Met Your Mother
Yip Yips, characters in the children's television program Sesame Street

See also
Yip (disambiguation)